The Emperor William Shaft ( or Schacht Kaiser Wilhelm II.) was the central hoisting and man-riding shaft of the lead and zinc mine in Clausthal-Zellerfeld in the Upper Harz in central Germany.

It was sited on the Burgstatt Lode (Burgstätter Gangzug). The surface installations were located in the borough of Clausthal on No. 24 Erzstraße, near the present-day mining institute of the University of Technology.

See also 

 Mining in the Upper Harz

Literature 
  – VI. Allgemeiner Deutscher Bergmannstag zu Hannover
 
  – Schriftenreihe des Oberharzer Geschichts- und Museumsvereins e. V. Clausthal-Zellerfeld

References

External links  
 Recollections of the Emperor William Shaft - in conversation with Upper Harz miners (film by Stefan Zimmer)

Former power stations in Germany
Clausthal-Zellerfeld
Underground mines in Germany
Former mines in Germany
Wilhelm II, German Emperor